Zygi is a small village on the south coast of Cyprus, between Limassol and Larnaca. Before 1974, Zygi had a mixed Greek- and Turkish-Cypriot population.

Explosion
The Evangelos Florakis Navy Base explosion of 11 July 2011 damaged every house in the village.

Refugee centre controversy
In 2018, the village was the site of protests supported by anti-immigrant party ELAM and members of the local council against the building of a centre for unaccompanied refugee children. Other residents disputed the protest. 
 
This controversy led to some Cypriots calling for a boycott of the village, which is famous for its taverns. Notably, a trip to the village by a nearby school was cancelled, after students refused to go, as they considered that their immigrant classmates wouldn't be welcome.

Notable residents
Notable people who reside in the village are horror-mystery writer Fivos Kyprianou and folklore poet Chambis Achniotis and Sophia Moustras.

References

Communities in Larnaca District